Rifleman was a  launched in 1809 for the Royal Navy. She served in the North Sea, on the Halifax and Jamaica stations, and in the Mediterranean Sea. During her service she recaptured a Royal Navy vessel in Danish service, and two privateers. The Navy sold her in 1836 and she proceed to sail as a merchantman and whaler between 1837 and 1856.

Royal Navy
Commander Alexander Innes commissioned Rifleman in September 1809. Commander Joseph Pearce replaced Innes in November 1810.

Rifleman left Portsmouth on 28 January 1811, bound for Oporto. On 9 March she left Falmouth as escort to a convoy 130 vessels bound for Lisbon and beyond.

On 11 May 1811 Rifleman encountered the Danish vessel The Alban, which was the former Royal Navy schooner  that the Danes had captured on 12 September 1809. The Alban was under the command of Lieutenant Thøger Emil Rosenørn when Rifleman encountered her near the Shetland Islands. Rifleman chased The Alban for twelve hours before she succeeded in capturing the Dane. The Alban was armed with 12 guns and had a crew of 58 men. She was three days out of Farsund, Norway, but had not captured anything.

According to Danish sources, Rosenørn fought bravely and when he saw that defeat was inevitable, he hacked away rigging and created holes in the hull before he surrendered. Even so, The Alban did not sink, and Rifleman sent her into Leith. The Royal Navy took her back into service as Alban.

Next Rifleman captured Liebe (28 February 1812), Maria Dorothea (7 March), and Bodel Maria (24 March).

On 9 March Rifleman was in company with Venus and shared in the proceeds of the capture the Danish sloop Anna Serina, J. Brodersoit, master.

Then on 19 May  Rifleman and Nightingale were again in company when they captured Palmtract (or Palmtree).

On 14 September Joseph, Richardson, master, arrived at Leith. War with America having broken out the month before, Rifleman had intercepted and detained her as she was sailing from Archangel to America. Rifleman captured the American droit Joseph Ricketson on 23 August.

Next, Rifleman captured Two Sisters, Garrett, master, as she was sailing from Bergen. Two Sisters arrived at Leith on 7 December.

On 23 March 1813 Pearce sailed Rifleman for the Leeward Islands station. Together with  she escorted seven troopships to Halifax, where they arrived on 1 June. The troops came from the 13th and the 64th Regiments of Foot.

On 14 September 1814 Rifleman picked up six escaped slaves in an open boat on the Chesapeake. On 27 September Rifleman delivered them to Halifax.

On 28 May 1814 Rifleman captured the American privateer Diomede off Sable Island. She mounted three 12-pounder and two 6-pounder guns and had a complement of 66 men. She was a schooner of 150 tons (bm), of Salem, and under the command of Captain J. Crowningshield. Rifleman sent Diomede into Halifax, where she arrived on 30 May.

Rifleman recaptured Goodintent, Fox, master, which an American privateer had captured as Goodintent was sailing from Newfoundland to Miramichi, New Brunswick. Goodintent arrived at Bermuda around 14 August.

During her time on the New England blockade, "Rifleman  had more punishments, with a higher number of lashes, than any other British ship in New England waters." In June 1814 Rifleman was under the command of Commander Henry Edward Napier, who sailed her for North America and the West Indies.

On 26 August 1814, a British squadron from Halifax moved to capture the Down East coastal town of Machias. The intention of the expedition was clearly to re-establish British title to Maine east of the Penobscot River, an area the British had renamed "New Ireland", and open the line of communications between Halifax and Quebec. The expedition was under the overall command of Sir John Sherbrooke and Rear Admiral Edward Griffith Colpoys controlled the naval elements. The British commanders then decided to capture Adams.

On the evening of 31 August, Sylph, Peruvian, and the transport Harmony, accompanied by a boat from Dragon, embarked marines, foot soldiers and a detachment from the Royal Artillery, to move up the Penobscot under the command of Captain Robert Barrie of Dragon. Here Adams had landed her guns and fortified a position on the bank with fifteen 18-pounders commanding the river. Moving up the river took two days, but eventually, after the Battle of Hampden, the British were able to capture the American defenders at Bangor, though not until after the Americans had burnt Adams. The British also captured 11 other ships and destroyed six. The British lost only one man killed, a sailor from Dragon, and had several soldiers wounded.

On 8 September, Bacchante, Rifleman, Tenedos, and Pictou captured the American schooner Fox at Machias, Maine. The British took the opportunity to confiscate a quantity of meat that they loaded on to Fox before they sent her to Saint John, New Brunswick.

Commander George Bennet Allen replaced Napier on 22 August 1815. (Napier declined accepting a piece of plate with which Nova Scotian merchants had wished to acknowledge his care in the conduct of convoys between the port of Saint John, New Brunswick and Castine, Maine.)

Commander Houston Stewart replaced Allen a year later, in August 1816, at Jamaica.

On 11 May 1817, Rifleman captured a brigantine off Aux Cayes, whose crew reported that she had been the famous Charleston privateer schooner Saucy Jack. The brigantine was armed with one 12-pounder gun and one 12-pounder carronade. She had a crew of 18 men "of all colours and nations", and was loaded with plunder. She had been a prize to the Carthaginian privateer Creole, which had fitted her out to cruise. However, part of the crew had mutinied and been landed. Rifleman took the 18 prisoners on board, brought them to Kingston, Jamaica, and handed them over to the police as pirates. A British prize crew, under a lieutenant, sailed the brigantine for Port Royal.

In June Commander Robert Felix replaced Stewart. Three months later, in September, Commander Norwich Duff replaced Felix. He sailed Rifleman to Portsmouth where she was paid off on 11 August 1818.

Between January and July 1820 she underwent repairs. She was not fitted for sea, however, until April to July 1823. In April, Commander James Montague recommissioned her for the Halifax station. Commander William Webb replaced him there in July 1824.

In December 1826 Commander Frederick Thomas Michell was in command and sailed Rifleman to the Mediterranean. There he was attached to the commissariat of the French army in the Morea. Rifleman did not participate in the battle of Navarino, though Admiral Sir Edward Codrington had her surveil the port for a period prior to the battle.

In June 1829 Rifleman accompanied  to Constantinople. Blonde was carrying the British ambassador Sir Robert Gordon to the Ottoman Court. Michell was promoted to post-captain 22 February 1830.

Codrington and Sir Pulteney Malcolm, the successive Commanders-in-Chief in the Mediterranean, and H.M. Ambassador at the Porte, recommended Michell to the Admiralty for promotion to post-captain for his services to them in the Mediterranean. Michell was promoted to post-captain 22 February 1830.

Rifleman was paid off in 1830. Thereafter she simply sat at Portsmouth.

Disposal: The "Principal Officers and Commissioners of His Majesty's Navy" offered "Rifleman, brig, 387 tons burthen", lying at Portsmouth, for sale on 21 January 1836. Rifleman sold on 21 January 1836 for £1,010.

Whaler and merchantman
The shipbuilders and owners Messrs. Green, Wigram and Green purchased Rifleman. They almost rebuilt her and fitted her out as a whaler. Rifleman made three whaling voyages between 1837 and 1856.

1st whaling voyage (1837–1841): Captain Henry William Davis sailed Rifleman from Britain on 24 October 1837, bound for New Zealand. Her owners for this voyage were Green & Co.
	
Rifleman was at New Zealand on 26 February 1838, but clean, i.e., without yet having taken any whales. She was at the Bay of Islands on 27 February with 40 barrels. She was still at New Zealand on 24 August, and with 1000 barrels by 19 January 1839. She was at Whytootaichi (Aitutaki, Cook Islands), on 7 June. She was again at New Zealand in January 1841, but had reached the Cape of Good Hope on 23 January. She returned to Britain on 6 April 1841 with 500 casks.
	
2nd whaling voyage (1841–1845): Rifleman left Britain on 13 October 1841, still under Davis's command, and bound for the Pacific Ocean. On 19 March 1842 she was again at the Bay of Islands, having come there via Hobart. She was at Pleasant Island (Nauru) on 31 August, Otaheite (Tahiti) between 15 March to 9 April 1843, Payta on 22 August, Gorgona (possibly Gorgona Island, Colombia), in August, Payta again on 5 September, Huahine on 18 September, Talcahuana on 10 May 1844, and at the Marquesas Islands on 28 January 1845. Rifleman returned to Britain on 4 July 1845.

On 3 September 1845 Rifleman was offered for sale. The advertisement announcing the sale reported that she had been sheathed in yellow metal prior to her second whaling voyage.

Rifleman first appeared in Lloyd's Register (LR), in the supplementary (late) pages volume for 1845.

Voyage to Australia (1846–1848): In January 1846 Rifleman, of 402 tons (bm), Hammack, master, sailed for Sydney, Australia for the "Australia Line of Packet Ships". She arrived in Sydney on 3 June. She then sailed to Singapore and Manila, before returning to Sydney. She sailed for England on 26 October 1847 and arrived back in England on 2 March 1848. As she was returning, on 29 February 1848 she ran aground at Shoebury Nock, beneath the Nore. The fishing smack Catherine Mary offered her assistance, which Riflemans master accepted. Catherine Mary remained until two steamers came up that were able to tow Rifleman off. Riflemans cargo of tea, hemp, and tallow was valued at £16,000; she was also carrying a number of passengers.{efn|By some reports she was also carrying 40 tuns of sperm oil. Catherine Mary submitted a claim for £125, which Riflemans owners rejected. The matter went to court where the judge awarded the plaintiffs £200 on the grounds that small claims against valuable cargoes should be supported to encourage salvage efforts.

Rifleman was an unusual name for a merchant ship, but unfortunately, not a unique one. After returning from Australia, Rifleman may have made a voyage to Rouen before once again sailing to Australia.

Voyage to Australia (1850–1851): Rifleman, Hammack, master, sailed for Sydney in February 1850. She arrived in July. On 26 August she sailed for Batavia, in ballast. She sailed from Singapore for London on 21 March 1851.

In 1852-1853 Rifleman apparently was not listed in LR. She did not reappear until 1854, by which time she had returned to whaling.

3rd whaling voyage (1852–1856): Rifleman, under the command of J. Grossman, left Britain for Timor on 28 December 1852. She was reported off Gaby Island on 10 September 1853 with 250 barrels. She returned to Britain on 1 September 1856.

Fate
Rifleman was no longer listed in Lloyd's Register for 1857.

Notes

Citations

References
 
 
 
 
 
 
 
 
 

 
1809 ships
Whaling ships
Age of Sail merchant ships
Merchant ships of the United Kingdom